Zbure is a village in the Municipality of Šmarješke Toplice in southeastern Slovenia. It lies north of Šmarjeta at the intersection of roads leading west to Mokronog and east to Škocjan. The area is part of the historical region of Lower Carniola. The municipality is now included in the Southeast Slovenia Statistical Region.

References

External links
Zbure at Geopedia

Populated places in the Municipality of Šmarješke Toplice